Boyanka Angelova (born October 28, 1994) is a Bulgarian gymnast, known for complex and difficult combinations in rhythmic gymnastics.

She has mistakenly been identified as the granddaughter of Nadia Comăneci, the first gymnast to receive a perfect 10, in a series of viral videos.

Biography 
In 2007 Boyanka Angelova was ranked first in the girls AA International Rhythmic Gymnastics Tournament in Varna for the "Queen Margarita".  Still at the age of 13, she won bronze medals with the ribbon and the hoop in the first round European competition in Moscow. She went on to come second to Russia's Yana Lukonina for her performance with the ball at the Junior European Championships in Turin in June 2008, and was very popular with the public.

Boyanka Angelova belongs to the CSKA sports club in Sofia. In 2010, she was appointed to the Bulgarian adult women's team for rhythmic gymnastics, but did not reach the finals.

Angelova has not competed since 2010, due to back pains from previous injuries.

References

External links

1994 births
Living people
Bulgarian rhythmic gymnasts